Mohammadiyeh (also Romanized as Moḩammadīyeh) is a village in Khorram Dasht Rural District, Kamareh District, Khomeyn County, Markazi Province, Iran. At the 2006 census, its population was 494, in 124 families.

References 

Populated places in Khomeyn County